Po Sang Bank was a bank established in 1949 in British Hong Kong. All other banks operated by the Bank of China in the territory were merged into the legal person of Po Sang Bank in 2001, and the legal person was renamed to Bank of China (Hong Kong).

One branch of the Po Sang was involved in what was then the largest holdup in the history of Hong Kong in 1974 and another in 1979 (and later involved HKP officer and SDU member Yee Wai-ming).

References

Defunct banks of Hong Kong
Bank of China
Banks disestablished in 2001
Banks established in 1949